The 2011 Tennislife Cup was a professional tennis tournament played on clay courts. It was the fifth edition of the tournament which was part of the 2011 ATP Challenger Tour. It took place in Napoli, Italy between 26 September and 2 October 2011.

Singles main-draw entrants

Seeds

 1 Rankings are as of September 19, 2011.

Other entrants
The following players received wildcards into the singles main draw:
  Enrico Burzi
  Marco Crugnola
  Gianluca Naso
  Matteo Trevisan

The following players received entry as a special exemption into the singles main draw:
  Aljaž Bedene

The following players received entry from the qualifying draw:
  Riccardo Bellotti
  Boris Pašanski
  Walter Trusendi
  Miljan Zekić

The following players received entry as a lucky loser into the singles main draw:
  Diego Schwartzman

Champions

Singles

 Leonardo Mayer def.  Alessandro Giannessi, 6–3, 6–4

Doubles

 Yuri Schukin /  Antonio Veić def.  Hsieh Cheng-peng /  Lee Hsin-han, 6–7(5–7), 7–5, [10–8]

External links
Official website
ITF Search
ATP official site

Tennislife Cup
Tennislife Cup
Clay court tennis tournaments